Jack Scott (born Giovanni Domenico Scafone Jr.; January 24, 1936 – December 12, 2019) was a Canadian-American singer and songwriter. He was inducted into the Canadian Songwriters Hall of Fame in 2011 and was called "undeniably the greatest Canadian rock and roll singer of all time."

Career
Scott spent his early childhood in Windsor, Ontario, across the river from Detroit, Michigan. When he was 10, his family moved to Hazel Park, a Detroit suburb. He grew up listening to hillbilly music and was taught to play the guitar by his mother, Laura. As a teenager, he pursued a singing career and recorded as "Jack Scott".  At the age of 18, he formed the Southern Drifters. After leading the band for three years, he signed to ABC-Paramount Records as a solo artist in 1957.

After recording two good-selling local hits for ABC-Paramount in 1957, he switched to the Carlton record label and had a double-sided national hit in 1958 with "Leroy" (#11) / "My True Love" (#3). The record sold over one million copies, earning Scott his first gold disc. Later in 1958, "With Your Love" (#28) reached the Top 40. In all, six of 12 songs on his first album became hit singles. On most of these tracks, he was backed up by the vocal group the Chantones.

He served in the United States Army during most of 1959, just after "Goodbye Baby" (#8) made the Top Ten. 1959 also saw him chart with "The Way I Walk" (#35).  Most of his Carlton master tapes were believed lost or destroyed until Rollercoaster Records in England released a vinyl EP, "Jack Scott Rocks", and CD, The Way I Walk, which were for the most part mastered from original tapes rather than the disc dubs used for previous reissues.

At the beginning of 1960, Scott again changed record labels, this time to Top Rank Records. He then recorded four Billboard Hot 100 hits – "What in the World's Come Over You" (#5), "Burning Bridges" (#3) b/w "Oh Little One" (#34), and "It Only Happened Yesterday" (#38). "What in the World's Come Over You" was Scott's second gold disc winner. Scott continued to record and perform during the 1960s and 1970s. His song "You're Just Gettin' Better" reached the country charts in 1974. In May 1977, he recorded a Peel session for BBC Radio 1 disc jockey John Peel.

Scott had more US singles (19), in a shorter period of time (41 months), than any other recording artist except for The Beatles, Elvis Presley, Fats Domino and Connie Francis. He wrote all of his own hits, except one: "Burning Bridges".

It has been said that "with the exception of Roy Orbison and Elvis Presley, no white rock and roller of the time ever developed a finer voice with a better range than Jack Scott, or cut a more convincing body of work in rockabilly, rock and roll, country-soul, gospel or blues".

Scott recorded his penultimate album, a live album with British band The Class of '58 whilst headlining at the Rockhouse Festival in the Netherlands in 1994; a recording which had to be postponed from its originally scheduled 1993 date due to the pregnancy of Double Bass player, Chris Coleman. The album was released in 1995 on the Rockhouse label.

In 2007, Jack Scott was voted into the Michigan Rock and Roll Legends Hall of Fame. In 2011, he was inducted into the Canadian Songwriters Hall of Fame. Later Scott was nominated for the Hit Parade Hall of Fame. He continued singing and touring and lived in a suburb of Detroit.

Scott's final album, the studio album "Way to Survive" was released in 2015, with Scott returning to his Rock & Roll roots whilst taking influences from two of his favorite music genres, country and blues.

Scott died of congestive heart failure on December 12, 2019, at the age of 83. His niece, singer and actress Rio Scafone, announced his death on her Facebook page, stating that he had suffered a massive heart attack on December 8 and there was nothing they could do for him. Scott died four days later, in the afternoon.

Discography

Albums

Singles

See also
List of Canadian musicians
Music of Detroit

References

External links
Bluelight Records
Rockabillyhall.com 
History-of-rock.com
Jack Scott music article
 

1936 births
2019 deaths
Canadian male singers
Canadian pop singers
Canadian rockabilly musicians
Canadian singer-songwriters
Canadian people of Italian descent
American country rock singers
American male singer-songwriters
American male pop singers
American people of Italian descent
Musicians from Windsor, Ontario
Jubilee Records artists
People from Hazel Park, Michigan
Canadian male singer-songwriters
Singer-songwriters from Michigan